Karabo Mothibi (born 15 October 1996) is a sprinter from Botswana.

International competitions

Did not start in the final

Personal bests
Outdoor
100 metres – 10.16 (Francistown 2016)
200 metres – 20.70 (+1.4 m/s, Gaborone 2016)

References

1996 births
Living people
Botswana male sprinters
Athletes (track and field) at the 2016 Summer Olympics
Olympic athletes of Botswana
Athletes (track and field) at the 2018 Commonwealth Games
People from Southern District (Botswana)
Athletes (track and field) at the 2019 African Games
Commonwealth Games competitors for Botswana
African Games competitors for Botswana